Bolshoy Dvor is a rural locality (a village) in Kubenskoye Rural Settlement, Vologodsky District, Vologda Oblast, Russia. The population was 4 as of 2002.

Geography 
Bolshoy Dvor is located 73 km northwest of Vologda (the district's administrative centre) by road. Dekteri is the nearest rural locality.

References 

Rural localities in Vologodsky District